

Laxmidas Purshottamdas Jai  (1 April 1902 – 29 January 1968) was a major figure in Indian cricket between the wars.

Jai was a graceful right-handed stroke-player. Most of his finer innings came in the Bombay Quadrangular competition. He captained Bombay to the title in the first ever Ranji Trophy championship.

He was selected to tour England with the Indian team in 1932 but, along with Vijay Merchant and Champak Mehta, refused on political grounds. His only Test was the first ever in India. He toured England in 1936 but a broken finger restricted his appearances.

He was a selector in the 1950s, before resigning over a dispute during the 1958/59 series against West Indies. The trophy awarded to the scorer of the fastest hundred in Ranji trophy every season was named after him.

Career
As was the case with cricketers prior to commercial sponsorships, Jai was employed by the Imperial Bank of India, later State Bank of India, by way of a job for life. This helped to nurture his hobby, philately. He became an eminent philatelist, being in a position to "rescue" every stamped envelope that came to the bank every day. He specialised in British Empire stamps.

Jai died on 29 January 1968 in Bombay from cardiac arrest.

References

Further reading

External links 
 

Indian cricketers
India Test cricketers
Mumbai cricketers
Hindus cricketers
Indian philatelists
1902 births
1968 deaths
India national cricket team selectors
Cricketers from Mumbai